John J. Harada is an American biologist, focusing in genomic, molecular, genetic, and biochemical, dissection of embryogenesis and seed development in plants, currently at University of California, Davis and an Elected Fellow of the American Association for the Advancement of Science and American Society of Plant Biology.

References

Year of birth missing (living people)
Living people
Fellows of the American Association for the Advancement of Science
University of California, Davis faculty
21st-century American biologists